Ivanovskaya is a rural locality (a village) in Ilezskoye Rural Settlement, Tarnogsky District, Vologda Oblast, Russia. The population was 16 as of 2002.

Geography 
Ivanovskaya is located 36 km northeast of Tarnogsky Gorodok (the district's administrative centre) by road. Michurovskaya is the nearest rural locality.

References 

Rural localities in Tarnogsky District